Enzo Bovis (born 23 April 1994) is a professional footballer who plays as a right-back for Fleury. Born in France, he plays for the Madagascar national team.

Professional career
Bovis began playing football with Fleury at the age of 5 and worked his way up all their youth levels. He began his senior career with the club in 2013 in the Championnat National 3, and helped them earn promotion to the Championnat National 2 in his debut season. Except for a period in 2018 where he played with Boulogne-Billancourt, Bovis has spent his entire career with Fleury.

International career
Bovis was first called up to the Madagascar national team for a set of friendlies in January 2021. He debuted in a 3–3 friendly tie with Congo on 24 September 2022.

Personal life
Bovis was born in France to a French father, and a Malagasy mother born in Mahajanga. He holds dual French-Malagasy citizenship. His father and grandfather were both presidents of the club Fleury.

References

External links
 
 

1994 births
Living people
People from Longjumeau
Malagasy footballers
Madagascar international footballers
French footballers
Malagasy people of French descent
French people of Malagasy descent
Association football fullbacks
Championnat National 2
Championnat National 3
AC Boulogne-Billancourt players
FC Fleury 91 players